Grand Haven Light can refer to one of three lighthouses in Grand Haven, Michigan.
 
 Grand Haven South Pierhead Entrance Light
 Grand Haven South Pierhead Inner Light